Empty Pockets is a lost 1918 American mystery silent black and white film directed by Herbert Brenon and written by George Edwards Hall. It is based on the novel by Rupert Hughes.

Cast
 Bert Lytell as Dr. Clinton Worthing
 Barbara Castleton as Muriel Schuyler
 Peggy Betts as Pet Bettanny
 Malcolm Williams as Perry Merrithew
Ketty Galanta as Maryla Sokalska
 Susanne Willa as Red Ida Ganley
 Ben Graham as Jacob Schuyler
 J. Thornton Baston as Shang Ganley

References

External links

 
 

American mystery films
1918 mystery films
American silent feature films
Lost American films
American black-and-white films
Films directed by Herbert Brenon
Films based on works by Rupert Hughes
First National Pictures films
1918 lost films
Lost mystery films
1910s American films
Silent mystery films